Computer Game Review was a print monthly magazine covering both computer gaming and video gaming. The magazine was started in 1991. Also known as Computer Game Review and 16-Bit Entertainment, and then later as Computer Game Review and CD-Rom Entertainment. The headquarters of the magazine which was part of Sendai Publication Group was in Lombard, Illinois.

Reviews typically consisted of a short, impartial synopsis of plot and gameplay, with separate scores assigned subjectively by each of three reviewers.  Games were rated out of 100, and if the game received a high enough ranking it would receive either a Platinum or Golden Triad Award.

The magazine folded in 1996, when Sendai Media Group was bought by Ziff-Davis, owner of the competing Computer Gaming World.

References

Monthly magazines published in the United States
Video game magazines published in the United States
Defunct computer magazines published in the United States
Home computer magazines
Magazines established in 1995
Magazines disestablished in 1996
Magazines published in Illinois